Damir Čanadi (born 6 May 1970) is an Austrian professional football manager and former player who is currently the head coach of Croatian Football League club HNK Šibenik.

A former midfielder, he has previously managed a number of lower and top division clubs in Austria such as FAC Team für Wien, 1. Simmeringer SC, FC Lustenau 07, SC Rheindorf Altach and Rapid Wien but also had stints in Germany and Greece with 1. FC Nürnberg and Atromitos.

Personal life
Čanadi is of Serbian and Croatian descent. His parents immigrated to Austria in 1967.

Čanadi's son Marcel is also a professional footballer who most recently played for Šibenik of the Croatian Football League.

Managerial statistics

Honours
DSV Fortuna 05 Wien
Wiener Stadtliga: 2002–03

1. Simmeringer SC
Wiener Stadtliga: 2010–11

SC Rheindorf Altach
Austrian Football First League: 2013–14

References

External links

 

Damir Canadi at Ran.de 

1970 births
Living people
Footballers from Vienna
Austrian people of Croatian descent
Austrian people of Serbian descent
Association football midfielders
Austrian footballers
FK Austria Wien players
SC Rheindorf Altach players
Austrian Football Bundesliga players
Austrian football managers
SK Rapid Wien managers
1. FC Nürnberg managers
SV Stockerau players
Floridsdorfer AC managers
1. Simmeringer SC managers
Atromitos F.C. managers
HNK Šibenik managers
Austrian Football Bundesliga managers
2. Bundesliga managers
Austrian expatriate football managers
Expatriate football managers in Greece
Austrian expatriate sportspeople in Greece
Expatriate football managers in Germany
Austrian expatriate sportspeople in Germany
Expatriate football managers in Croatia
Austrian expatriate sportspeople in Croatia